The men's 67.5 kg weightlifting competitions at the 1976 Summer Olympics in Montreal took place on 21 July at the St. Michel Arena. It was the thirteenth appearance of the lightweight class.

Results

References

Weightlifting at the 1976 Summer Olympics